Integrator complex subunit 6 is a protein that in humans is encoded by the INTS6 gene.

DEAD box proteins, characterized by the conserved motif Asp-Glu-Ala-Asp (DEAD), are putative RNA helicases. The protein encoded by this gene is a DEAD box protein that is part of a complex that interacts with the C-terminus of RNA polymerase II and is involved in 3' end processing of snRNAs. In addition, this gene is a candidate tumor suppressor and located in the critical region of loss of heterozygosity (LOH). Three transcript variants encoding two different isoforms have been found for this gene.

References

Further reading